Sandrine Dumas (born 28 April 1963) is a French film and stage actress and director.

Dumas was born in Neuilly-sur-Seine. She has appeared in Miloš Forman's Valmont, and Krzysztof Kieślowski's The Double Life of Véronique, among other films.

She is the daughter of Jean-Louis Dumas (2 February 1938 - 1 May 2010), who was the fifth generation of the family to run one of the world's most renowned high fashion house, Hermès.

Filmography 
 2008 : 48 Hours a Day

Direction 
 2011 :  with Katia Golubeva, Prix du Public of the Créteil International Women's Film Festival
 2015 : Nostos, selected for the 2016 Thessaloniki Documentary Festival
 2019 :  with Monia Chokri and Jérémie Elkaïm

Theater 
She won the Globes de Cristal Award for Best Play for directing Love Letters in 2006.

External links

1963 births
Living people
People from Neuilly-sur-Seine
French film actresses
French film directors
Sandrine
French people of Greek descent
20th-century French actresses